Fantastická fakta (Fantastic facts) is a Czech monthly paranormal magazine. It deals with unexplained phenomena, UFOs, and urban legends.

History and profile
Fantastická fakta was first published in August 1997. The headquarters is in Prague. The magazine is published on a monthly basis. The launching editor-in-chief was Vladimír Mátl. Ivan Mackerle was the chief editor from 1998 to 2002.

See also
 List of magazines in the Czech Republic

References

External links
Official site

1997 establishments in the Czech Republic
Czech-language magazines
Magazines established in 1997
Magazines published in Prague
Monthly magazines
Paranormal magazines
Science fiction magazines